Leptogenys_diminuta, is a species of ant of the subfamily Ponerinae. 12 subspecies recognized.

Subspecies
Leptogenys diminuta deceptrix Forel, 1901 - India
Leptogenys diminuta diminuta (Smith, F., 1857) - Australia, Borneo, Indonesia, New Guinea, Philippines, Solomon Islands, Bangladesh, India, Myanmar, Sri Lanka, Thailand, Vietnam, China
Leptogenys diminuta diminutolaeviceps Forel, 1900 - India
Leptogenys diminuta fruhstorferi Emery, 1896 - Indonesia
Leptogenys diminuta laeviceps Smith, F., 1857 - Borneo, India
Leptogenys diminuta nongnongi Karavaiev, 1925 - Indonesia
Leptogenys diminuta opacinodis Emery, 1887 - Indonesia
Leptogenys diminuta palliseri Forel, 1900 - India
Leptogenys diminuta sarasinorum Forel, 1900 - Nepal
Leptogenys diminuta striatula Emery, 1895 - Myanmar
Leptogenys diminuta tjibodana Karavaiev, 1926 - Indonesia
Leptogenys diminuta woodmasoni Forel, 1886 - India

References

Animaldiversity.org
Itis.org
Images at Wikimedia

External links

 at antwiki.org

Ponerinae
Hymenoptera of Asia
Insects described in 1857